Christophe Lauwers (born 17 September 1972) is a Belgian footballer who, as of 2006 was playing for K.V. Oostende. He has two caps for the Belgium national football team. He played as a striker.

Clubs
1990–1997 :  Cercle Brugge K.S.V.
1997–1999 :  K.S.C. Eendracht Aalst
1999 :  Toulouse FC
1999–2002 :  SV Ried
2002–2003 :  C.S. Visé
2003–2004 :  K.V. Oostende
2004–2006 :  K.S.V. Roeselare
2006–2007 :  K.V. Oostende
2007:  K.V.G. Oostende
Present:  K.W.S. Oudenburg

External links
 
 

1972 births
Living people
Belgian footballers
Belgian Pro League players
Cercle Brugge K.S.V. players
Toulouse FC players
K.S.V. Roeselare players
Belgium international footballers
Belgian expatriate footballers
Expatriate footballers in France
Expatriate footballers in Austria
Belgian expatriate sportspeople in France
Belgian expatriate sportspeople in Austria
Ligue 1 players
C.S. Visé players
Austrian Football Bundesliga players
SV Ried players
S.C. Eendracht Aalst players
Association football forwards